Guerra de mujeres (English title: War of the women) is a Venezuelan telenovela written by César Miguel Rondon and Monica Montañés, and it was produced by Venevisión in 2001.

Gaby Espino, Jorge Reyes and Mimí Lazo starred as the main protagonists.

Plot
Yubiri is a young woman with dreams of having a successful career and meeting the man of her dreams, but she still doesn't know how she will achieve all this. Through a visit to a fortune teller, she is told that on the same night at 12 midnight, she will finally meet her lover. However, the fortune teller's premonition is fulfilled, twice. Yubiri will meet Wilker, a young singer full of life and eager to conquer the world. At the same time, Juan Diego, a young man who has secretly been attracted to her, will appear in her life.

Guerra de mujeres is a story about women who are in a constant fight to achieve their goals and dreams while always being guided by love.

Cast

 Gaby Espino as Yubirí Gamboa
 Jorge Reyes as Wilker Antonio
 Adrián Delgado as Juan Diego Herrera
 Mimí Lazo as Brígida "Brigitte" de Bonilla
 Caridad Canelón as Bienvenida de Gamboa
 Daniel Alvarado as Junior Bonilla
 Nohely Arteaga as Ana
 Aroldo Betancourt as Olegario
 Beatriz Valdés as Gisela
 Milena Santander as Fina "Finita" Rincón de Botero
 Lourdes Valera as Dolores "Lolita"
 Roberto Lamarca as Fabián Botero
 Henry Galué as Mauricio Villone
 Fernando Villate as Kowalsky
 Carlos Mata as Atanasio Herrera
 Víctor Cámara as Armando
 Eva Blanco as Dionisia
 José Oliva as Primero
 Elaiza Gil as Xiolimar
 Marjorie De Sousa as Carolina Bonilla
 Ramón Hinojosa
 Beba Rojas as Graciela Gamboa
 Denise Novell as Natalia
 Liorvis Sivira as Segundo
 Yeinar Moreno as Jessica
 José Zambrano as Felix
 Yanín Barboza as Clarissa
 José Luis Zuleta as Segundo
 Reinaldo José Pérez as Pastor
 María Antonieta Duque as Blanquita
 Asdrúbal Blanco as Javier
 Wilmer Machado as Pipo
 Gustavo Wassermann as Barman
 Josué Villae as Alberto
 Samantha Suárez as Mayerlin
 Michelle Nassef as Corina Botero Rincon
 Auremily Romero as Marina Botero Rincon
 Adrián Durán as Carlitos
 Juan Franquiz as Melendez
 Irene Clemente as Margot
 Annaliesse Suegart as Yolanda
 Alfredo Naranjo

References

External links

2001 telenovelas
2001 Venezuelan television series debuts
2002 Venezuelan television series endings
Venevisión telenovelas
Spanish-language telenovelas
Venezuelan telenovelas
Television shows set in Caracas